Diane Warren is an American songwriter. The following are a list of her wins and nominations for awards in music.

She's received a Primetime Emmy Award, a Grammy Award, a Critics' Choice Movie Award, and two Golden Globe Awards. She earned fourteen Academy Award nominations, and received an Academy Honorary Award at the Governors Awards in 2022. In 2001, Warren was inducted into the Songwriters Hall of Fame and received a star on the Hollywood Walk of Fame.

Major awards

Academy Awards

Critics' Choice Movie Awards

Emmy Awards

Golden Globe Awards

Grammy Awards

Miscellaneous awards

Academy of Country Music Awards

ASCAP Film and Television Music Awards

Awards Circuit Community Awards

Billboard Music Awards

Black Reel Awards

Capri Hollywood International Film Festival

CinEuphoria Awards

David di Donatello Awards

Denver Film Critics Society Awards

Georgia Film Critics Association Awards

Gold Derby Awards

Golden Raspberry Awards

Guild of Music Supervisors Awards

Hawaii Film Critics Society Awards

Hollywood Film Awards

Hollywood Music in Media Awards

Houston Film Critics Society Awards

International Online Cinema Awards

LA Music Awards

Latino Entertainment Journalists Association Film Awards

New Mexico Film Critics Awards

Online Film & Television Association Awards

Palm Springs International Film Festival

Phoenix Film Critics Society Awards

Santa Barbara International Film Festival

Satellite Awards

Seattle Film Critics Society Awards

Society of Composers & Lyricists

Transatlantyk Festival

Women in Film Crystal + Lucy Awards

World Soundtrack Awards

Special honors

The Hollywood Reporter and Billboard

Hollywood Walk of Fame

Polar Music Prize

Songwriters Hall of Fame

Notes

References

Warren, Diane